The Friary, formally known as Blessed Agnellus of Pisa Friary, formerly All Saints Convent or St John's Home is a centre of formation for the Franciscan Order of Friars Minor Conventual in Cowley, Oxford, England. The building was constructed in 1873 as the convent of the Anglican Society of All Saints Sisters of the Poor. It is situated between St Mary's Road and Cowley Road, next to St John's Care Home and Helen & Douglas House. The friary and its chapel are Grade II listed buildings.

History

Construction
In 1869, the Society of All Saints Sisters of the Poor were invited to Oxford by the founder of the Society of St John the Evangelist, Richard Meux Benson to run the St John's Home hospital. A convent was needed to house the sisters working in the hospital. In 1873, the foundation stone was laid by Prince Leopold, Duke of Albany, for the adjacent convent to the south of the hospital. The building was designed by Charles Buckeridge. From 1882 to 1891, further work was done of the building, overseen by the architect John Loughborough Pearson. In 1906, the present chapel, designed by Ninian Comper, was built. In 1982, Sister Frances Ritchie of the All Saints Sisters founded Helen & Douglas House next door.

Conventual Franciscans
In 2013, the Franciscan Order of Friars Minor Conventual returned to work in Oxford for the first time since the Reformation. They started a centre for formation in Holton. In July 2014, they moved to All Saints Convent after the All Saints sisters moved into a smaller residence.

See also
 Greyfriars, Oxford
 List of monastic houses in England

References

External links
 
 The Friary, Oxford from TheGreyFriars.org

Friaries in England
Order of Friars Minor Conventual
Grade II listed buildings in Oxford
Grade II listed churches in Oxfordshire
Religious buildings and structures in Oxford
1873 establishments in England
Gothic Revival architecture in Oxfordshire
Roman Catholic chapels in England
19th-century Roman Catholic church buildings in the United Kingdom
Former Church of England church buildings
Gothic Revival church buildings in England